was a Japanese kabuki performer, known both for his own work and for his place in the lineage of a family of kabuki actors in Edo during the Edo period. He was the son of Iwai Hanshirō IV.  
 
Iwai Hanshirō was a stage name with significant cultural and historical connotations.

In the conservative Kabuki world, stage names are passed from father to son in formal system which converts the kabuki stage name into a mark of accomplishment. This actor assumed the mantle of his father's stage name in 1804.

 Lineage of Iwai stage names
 Iwai Hanshirō I (1652–1699)
 Iwai Hanshirō II (d. 1710)
 Iwai Hanshirō III (1698–1760)
 Iwai Hanshirō IV (1747–1800)
 Iwai Hanshirō V (1776–1847)
 Iwai Hanshirō VI (1799–1836)
 Iwai Hanshirō VII (1804–1845) 
 Iwai Hanshirō VIII (1829–1882)
 Iwai Hanshirō IX (1882–1945)
 Iwai Hanshirō X (1927-2011)
 Iwai Hanshiro (2021 - )

See also
 Shūmei

Notes

References
 Leiter, Samuel L. (2006).  Historical Dictionary of Japanese Traditional Theatre. Lanham, Maryland: Scarecrow Press. ;   OCLC 238637010
 Nussbaum, Louis Frédéric and Käthe Roth. (2005). Japan Encyclopedia. Cambridge: Harvard University Press. ; OCLC 48943301
 Scott, Adolphe Clarence. (1955). The Kabuki Theatre of Japan. London: Allen & Unwin.  OCLC 622644114

Kabuki actors
1776 births
1847 deaths
People from Tokyo
Male actors from Tokyo